The Royal Glamorgan Hospital, is a District General Hospital in Ynysmaerdy, Talbot Green, Rhondda Cynon Taf, South Wales. It is managed by the Cwm Taf Morgannwg University Health Board.

History
The hospital was commissioned to replace the aging East Glamorgan General Hospital. It was built at a cost of £103 million and was opened at Ely Meadow in 1999. In 2017 the Hospital Board announced that the Special Care Baby Unit would be moved to Prince Charles Hospital in Merthyr Tydfil.

Services
There is an accident and emergency facility at the hospital as well as an acute mental health unit.

References

External links 
Royal Glamorgan Hospital

Hospital buildings completed in 2000
Hospitals in Rhondda Cynon Taf
Hospitals established in 2000
NHS hospitals in Wales
2000 establishments in Wales
Cwm Taf Morgannwg University Health Board